Saint-Pierre-de-Côle (literally Saint-Pierre of Côle; Limousin: Sent Peir de Còla) is a commune in the Dordogne department in Nouvelle-Aquitaine in southwestern France.

Geography
The river Côle flows southwestward through the middle of the commune, crosses the village and forms part of the commune's south-western border. The village straddles the D 78 road from Brantôme to Saint-Jean-de-Côle. At the centre of the village is the village square with an ancient Romanesque church which has been heavily restored and the cafe/restaurant 'La Marmite'. There is also a post office and a bakery in the village.

The village festival takes place on the first weekend in August, and there are fireworks on the river.

Population

See also
Communes of the Dordogne department

References

Communes of Dordogne